Aramburo or Arámburo is a surname of Basque origins that may refer to

Alberto Alvarado Arámburo (1925–1996), Mexican politician 
Ana Santos Aramburo (born 1957), Spanish librarian 
Ángel César Mendoza Arámburo (1934–2014), Mexican politician
Diego Aramburo (born 1971), Bolivian actress, director, and playwright 

Basque-language surnames